Karnataka State Highway 6, commonly referred to as KA SH 6, is a normal state highway that runs through Uttara Kannada, Haveri, Gadag and Bagalkot districts in the state of Karnataka. This state highway touches numerous cities and villages Viz.Kaiga, Yellapura and Gadag. The total length of the highway is 332 km.

Route description 
The route followed by this highway is Karwar - Kaiga - Yellapura - Mundgod - Bankapura - Savanur - Gadag - Gajendragarh -

Hanumasagara - Ilkal

References

See also
 List of State Highways in Karnataka

State Highways in Karnataka
Roads in Uttara Kannada district
Roads in Bagalkot district